The Nheengatu language (Tupi: , nheengatu rionegrino: yẽgatu, nheengatu tradicional: nhẽẽgatú e nheengatu tapajoawara: nheẽgatu), often written Nhengatu, is an indigenous language of the Tupi-Guarani family, the direct modern descendant of Tupinambá, or Tupi, which extended throughout the Amazon rainforest from Maranhão.

The language name derives from the words nhẽẽga (meaning "language" or "word") and katu (meaning "good"). The related language name Ñeꞌengatú in Paraguay is similarly derived. Thus, nheengatu is referred to by a wide variety of names in literature, including Nhengatu, Tupi Costeiro, Geral, Yeral (in Venezuela), Tupi Moderno, Nyengato, Nyengatú, Waengatu, Neegatú, Is'engatu, Língua Brasílica, Tupi Amazônico, Ñe'engatú, Nhangatu, Inhangatu, Nenhengatu, Yẽgatú, Nyenngatú, Tupi and Lingua Geral. It is also commonly referred to as the Língua Geral Amazônica (LGA) in Brazil.

It is spoken throughout the Rio Negro region among the Baniwa, Baré and Warekena peoples, etc., mainly in the municipality of São Gabriel da Cachoeira, in the state of Amazonas, Brazil, where, since 2002 it has been one of the official languages (along with Baníwa, Yepá-masã, and Portuguese), in addition to being spoken in the Baixo Amazonas region (in the state of Amazonas), among the Sateré-Mawé, Maraguá and Mura peoples, and in the Baixo Tapajós, and in the state of Pará, where it is being revitalized among the different peoples of the region, like the Borari and the Tupinambá people, and also, among the riverside dwellers themselves. Currently, it continues to be spoken by approximately 20,060 people, in three linguistic variants in Brazil: that of the Rio Negro region, called Yẽgatu, that of the Baixo Amazonas, known as traditional nheengatú and that of the baixo rio Tapajós or nheengatu tapajoawara, in addition of the foreign variants: nheengatu from Venezuela (ñeengatu) and nheengatu from Colombia (nyengatu).

Technology further helps in the language's revitalization. Recently, UFOPA student Suellen Tobler created a single web application called Nheengatu App, in the style of the Duolingo teaching platform and now has the support of the Pará State Government, university professors and natives in building the application. The Motorola project was another project that further helped the language's popularity, conceived in 2020, the company's smartphones now feature the Nheengatu language. There is an increasing number of enthusiasts about learning the Nheengatu language through tools and study groups on WhatsApp, Facebook and Instagram, other means on the internet and even university courses.

Language history 
Belonging to the Tupi-Guarani linguistic family, the nheengatu emerged in the 18th century, as a natural evolution of the ancient Amazonian Tupinambá, a regional Tupi variant that originated in the famous Odisseia Tupínambá, the exodus of that nation that, fleeing from Portuguese invaders on the Bahia coast, entered the Amazon and settled first in Maranhão, and from there to the bay of Guajará (Belém), the mouth of the Tapajós river to the Tupinambarana island (Parintins), between the borders of Pará and Amazonas. The language of the Tupinambás then, as it belongs to a feared and conquering people, became a lingua franca, which in contact with the conquered languages ​​gained its own differentiation, hence why the Arawak peoples of the Parintins region came to be called Tupinambaranas, among them, the maraguazes, the çapupés, the curiatós, the Parintins and the saterés themselves.

Already with the Amazon conquered by the Portuguese, a fact that occurred from 1600, and having established a colony at the beginning of the 17th century, the so-called state of Grão-Pará and Maranhão, whose capital Belém was named Cidade dos Tupinambás or Tupinãbá marií , Franciscan and Jesuit priests, aiming at catechism from that language, elaborated the grammar and their own orthography, although Latinized, which resulted in the northern general language, or general Amazonian language, (a name still used today), whose development took place parallel to that of São Paulo general language (extinct). Since then, Nheengatu has spread throughout the Amazon as an instrument of colonization, Portuguese domain and linguistic standardization, where many peoples started to have it as their main language at the expense of their own, as well as peoples like Hanera, better known as Baré , became a Nheengatu speaker, which led to the extinction of their own language or the Maraguá people, who even a historical speaker of Nheengatu recently sought to revitalize their own language and today they learn Maraguá along with Nheengatu in local schools.

The number of speakers of other languages vastly outnumbered the Portuguese settlers in the Amazon, so much so that the Portuguese themselves adapted to the native language. "To speak or converse in the colony of Grão Pará, I had to use nheengatu, if not, I would be talking to myself since no one used Portuguese, except in the government palace in Belém and among the Portuguese themselves."

The General Language was established as the official language from 1689 to 1727 in the Amazon (Grão Pará and Maranhão), but with the aim of deculturating the Amazon people, the Portuguese language was promoted, but without success. In the mid-18th century, the Amazon General Language (distinct from the São Paulo General Language, a similar variety used further south) was used throughout the colony. At this point, Tupinambá remained intact, but as a "liturgical language". The languages ​​used in everyday life evolved drastically over the century due to contact with the language, with Tupinambá as the “language of rituals, and Amazonian General Language, the language of popular communication and therefore of religious instruction.” Moore (2014) notes that by the mid-18th century, the Amazon and Tupinambá General Languages were already distinct. Until then, the original Tupinambá community was facing a decline, but other speaking communities were still required by Portuguese missionaries to learn the Tupinambá language. Efforts to communicate between communities resulted in the "corruption" of the Tupinambá language, hence the distinction between Tupinambá and the Amazonian general language.

Nheengatu continued to evolve as it expanded into the Alto Rio Negro region. There was contact with other languages such as Marawá, Baníwa, Warekana, Tucano and Dâw (Cabalzar; Ricardo 2006 in Cruz 2015).

The General Language evolved into two branches, the Northern General Language (Amazonian) and the Southern General Language (Paulista), which at its height became the dominant language of the vast Brazilian territory.

An anonymous manuscript from the 18th century is emblematically titled "Dictionary of the general language of Brazil, spoken in all the towns, places, and villages of this vast State, written in the city of Pará, year 1771".

If Nheengatu was the major obstacle for the cultural and linguistic domination of Portuguese in the region, the colonizers saw that it was necessary to take it away from the people and impose the Portuguese language, which at first was not successful since the general language was very well rooted both among indigenous people and in the speech of blacks and whites themselves. The language had its first ban on the part of the Portuguese government, during the administration of the Marquis of Pombal, who intended to impose the Portuguese language in the Amazon and make the names of places Portuguese. Hence, why many places have their names changed from nheengatu to names of places and cities in Portugal, thus appearing names that today make up Amazonian municipalities such as Santarém, Aveiro, Barcelos, Belém, Óbidos, Faro, Alenquer and Moz.

With the independence of Brazil in 1822, even though Grão-Pará (Amazon) is a separate Portuguese colony, its local rulers decided to integrate into the new country, which greatly displeased the inhabitants of indigenous origin who were the majority of the people in general, which later led the Amazon to an independence revolution that lasted ten years.

The second ban on the language came right after this revolution better known as Cabanagem or War of the Cabanos, and when the rebels were defeated (1860), the Brazilian government imposed a harsh persecution of the speakers of Nheengatu. Half of the male population of Grão-Pará (Amazon) was murdered and anyone who was caught speaking in nheengatu was punished and if they were not contacted indigenous, they were baptized by priests and received their surnames on certificates, since the priests themselves were their godparents, this resulted in people of indigenous origin with Portuguese surnames without even being heirs to colonists. The imposition of the Portuguese language this time had an effect and with the advent of Portuguese schools, the population was herded to the new language.

Also in the 20th century, due to economic and political events, such as the Amazon Rubber boom (coming from huge waves of settlers from the Northeast, encouraged by the government, to the Amazon), the presence was felt again due to these events, forcing indigenous peoples to move or be subjected to forced labor. His language, of course, was again influenced by the increased presence of Portuguese speakers.

What was not enough for the extinction of the Nheengatu language (intended by the government), it remained mainly among the most distant inhabitants of the urban centers, in the families heirs from the cabanos and among unsubmitted peoples. Furthermore, "tapuios" (ribeirinhos) kept their accent and part of their speech tied to their language. Until 1920 it was common for nheengatu to be used in traditional commercial centers in Manaus, Santarém, Parintins and Belém.

The time has passed. The conquest of the Portuguese language was consolidated, but the nheengatu did not disappear. It was rooted in the Amazonian language, in the accent of the riverside dwellers and the indigenous peoples of the Negro River, under Amazons even though they are at risk of disappearing. But with the Motorola project for language translation in telephony, the language returned to protagonist engagement and in 2020, language teachers and activists in the three variants came together to create an academy, the Academy of Nheengatu Language (ALN), to regularize it, standardize it in three variants and thus regain part of the lost space and in search of the place that was taken from it, the mother tongue that is the face of the Amazon's identity.

Current use 
Currently, Nheengatu is still spoken by around 73.31% of the 29.9 thousand inhabitants of São Gabriel da Cachoeira, Brazil (IBGE 2000 Census), around 3000 people in Colombia and 2000 people in Venezuela, especially in Negro River basin (Uaupés and Içana rivers). Furthermore, it is the native language of the caboclo population and maintains the character of a language of communication between Indigenous and non-Indigenous, or between Indigenous of different languages. It is also an instrument of ethnic affirmation of Amazonian indigenous peoples who have lost their native languages, such as Barés, Arapaços, Baniuas, Uarequenas and others.

Nheengatu is one of the four official languages of the municipality of São Gabriel da Cachoeira, in northwestern Amazonas state, Brazil.

As many as 19,000 Nheengatu speakers worldwide are possible, according to The Ethnologue (2005), although some journalists have reported as many as 30,000. The language has recently regained some recognition and prominence after being suppressed for many years. It is spoken in the Alto Rio Negro region, in the state of Amazonas, in the Brazilian Amazon and in neighboring parts of Colombia and Venezuela. It is the native language of the rural population of the area and is also used as a common language of communication between indigenous and non-indigenous people and between indigenous peoples of different peoples.

In 1998, University of São Paulo professor Eduardo de Almeida Navarro founded the Tupi Aqui organization dedicated to promoting the teaching of historical Tupi and Nheengatu in high schools in São Paulo and elsewhere in Brazil. Professor Navarro wrote a textbook for teaching Nheengatu that Tupi Aqui makes available, along with other teaching materials, on a website hosted by the University of São Paulo.

In December 2002, Nheengatu gained official language status alongside Portuguese in the municipality of São Gabriel da Cachoeira, Brazil, where many speakers are concentrated, in accordance with local law 145/2002.

Ethnologue rates Nheengatu as "changing" with a rating of 7 on the Gradual Intergenerational Interruption Scale (GIDS) (Simons and Fennig 2017). According to this scale, this classification suggests that "the population of children may use the language among themselves, but it is not being transmitted to children". According to the UNESCO Atlas of Endangered Languages of the World, Nheengatu is classified as "severely endangered".

Motorola project 
In 2020, he started a project whose objective was to translate the Nheengatu and Kaingang languages into the company's mobile telephony. They were the first two native languages in Brazil to be designed for telephony, which is defined as a great achievement for their survival and giving them the status of international and modern languages. Thus, speaking professors and activists together with linguist professors working for the company began to work on the project, which lasted a year and a half, until it was launched in the international and Brazilian market. During meetings, a single spelling was agreed upon, coming from the union of the three recognized, precisely so that there would be no further dispute. Traditional nheengatu and tapajoawara for maintaining the form of most words in the ancient language such as the use of ‘nh’ and the ending sawa/tawa/pawa became the basis, however, with several features of yẽgatu in the form of its unified spelling. From there, a script capable of being understood by all variants could be organized. Completing the project, professors Luzinete Baré and Edson Baré, for yẽgatu, professor and writer Yaguarê Yamã for traditional, and professor Kawã Wirapaye Borari for nheengatu tapajoawara, closed the project, which had great repercussion in the national and international press. Later in 2022, Lenovo (Motorola's Parent Company) started to develop the work to enable the language in their Linux PCs.

Language family 
Nheengatu developed from the extinct Tupinambá language and belongs to the Tupi-Guarani branch of the Tupi language family. The Tupi-Guarani language family is responsible for a large and diverse group of languages "including, for example, Xetá, Sirionó, Araweté, Ka'apor, Kamayurá, Guajá and Tapirapé". Many of these languages differed years before the arrival of the Portuguese in Brazil. Over time, the term Tupinambá was used to describe groups that were "lingually and culturally related", even though the original tribe had disappeared.

Taking personal pronouns as an example, see a comparison between brazilian Portuguese, ancient Tupi and Nheengatu:

Tupinologist Eduardo de Almeida Navarro argues that Nheengatu, with its current characteristics, would only have emerged in the 19th century, as a natural evolution of the northern general language.

Comparisons between Tupi, Portuguese and Nheengatu variants:

Academy of Nheengatu Language (ALN) 
It was a dream realized by indigenous teachers and language activists whose objective was to regain the space lost by the nheengatu over years of prohibition, and leverage their learning among indigenous and non-indigenous people. The Motorola project came to formalize the group of activists, which culminated in the creation of the academy, online due to the COVID-19 pandemic, which prevents even today (10/2021) from having face-to-face meetings in a nearby capital, that is, Manaus.

Chosen the patrons of the 25 chairs, four people, are part of the board, among them, Edson Baré, its first president. The same chairs are organized by region: 10 are for yẽgatu speakers, 7 are for traditional nheengatu speakers, 7 are for nheengatu tapajoawara speakers, and the last 3 chairs are reserved for nheengatu speakers who do not belong to the three regions.

The forum city is the city of Manaus, and the seat of the academy is Manaus and Santarém.

Nheengatu in northeastern Brazil 
It is known that the nheengatu originated in the Amazonian Tupinambá, a Tupi variant located more precisely in Maranhão than during Portuguese colonization, it was part of the state of Grão Pará and Maranhão. Since then, nheengatu has also been understood as a culture from Maranhão. What few cite is the presence of the nheengatu in northeastern Brazil properly speaking. Mainly Ceará, Piauí and Rio Grande do Norte. Affirmation that proceeds as new evidence is discovered, both old and current. Thus came the case of the municipality of Monsenhor Tabosa which made the Nheengatu language official in the municipality and planned to adopt the language in municipal schools. As the local newspaper says: “The municipal council of Monsenhor Tabosa unanimously approved a bill that recognizes the native language Tupi-Nheengatu as the co-official language of the municipality. The legal text has already been sanctioned by Mayor Salomão de Araújo Souza, who is a descendant of indigenous peoples”.

As in the municipality of Monsenhor Tabosa, the number of indigenous people and descendants from the Northeast try to learn the language not only because they think it is beautiful, but because it has "always been" part of the native regional culture.

Existing literature 
Over the course of its evolution since its beginnings as Tupinambá, extensive research has been done on Nheengatu. There have been studies done at each phase of its evolution, but much has been focused on how aspects of Nheengatu, such as its grammar or phonology, have changed upon contact over the years. (Facundes et al. 1994 and Rodrigues 1958, 1986).

As mentioned earlier, the first documents that were produced were by Jesuit missionaries in the 16th and 17th centuries, such as Arte da Grammatica da Lingoa mais usada na costa do Brasil by Father José de Anchieta (1595) and Arte da Língua Brasilíca by Luis Figueira (1621). These were detailed grammars that served their religious purposes. Multiple dictionaries have also been written over the years (Mello 1967, Grenand and Epaminondas 1989, Barbosa 1951). More recently, Stradelli (2014) also published a Portuguese-Nheengatu dictionary.

There have also been several linguistic studies of Nheengatu more recently, such as Borges (1991)’s thesis on Nheengatu phonology and Cruz (2011)’s detailed paper on the phonology and grammar of Nheengatu. She also studied the rise of number agreement in modern Nheengatu, by analyzing how grammaticalization occurred over the course of its evolution from Tupinambá (Cruz 2015).  Cruz (2014) also studies reduplication in Nheengatu in detail, as well as morphological fission in bitransitive constructions. A proper textbook for the conducting of Nheengatu classes has also been written. (Navarro 2011). Lima and Sirvana (2017) provides a sociolinguistic study of Nheengatu in the Pisasu Sarusawa community of the Baré people, in Manaus, Amazonas.

Language documentation projects 
Language documentation agencies (such as SOAS, Museu do Índio, Museu Goeldi and Dobes) are currently not engaged in any language documentation project for Nheengatu. However, research on Nheengatu by Moore (1994) was supported by Museu Goeldi and the Brazilian National Research Council (CNPq), and funded by the Society for the Study of the Indigenous Languages of the Americas (SSILA) and the Inter-American Foundation. In this study, Moore focused on the effects of language contact, and how Nheengatu evolved over the years with the help of a Nheengatu-speaking informant. Moore (2014) urges for the “location and documentation of modern dialects of Nheengatu”, due to their risk of becoming extinct.

Ethnography 
Anthropological research has been done on the changing cultural landscapes along the Amazon, as well as life of the Tupinambá people and their interactions with the Jesuits. Floyd (2007) describes how populations navigate between their “traditional” and “acculturated” spheres. Other studies have focused on the impact of urbanization on Indigenous populations in the Amazon (de Oliveira 2001).

Characteristics 
In addition to the previously mentioned general language of São Paulo, now extinct, Nheengatu is closely related to ancient Tupi, an extinct language, and to the Guarani of Paraguay, which, far from being extinct, is the most spoken language in that country and one of its official languages. According to some sourcesin what language and historical stage? Sources?, ancient Nheengatu and Guarani were mutually intelligible in the past.

Writing (the three recognized spellings) 
Over time, several conventions have been used to write nheengatu based on the Latin alphabet and according to the rules of Portuguese, using spellings such as "nh"; "c"; "ç", "ce", "ci"; "que", "qui"; "h" mute; "n" at end of syllable as nasalization mark; "u" and "i" used interchangeably as vowels and semivowels; etc. Thus, it was done for the first time, as Catholic priests during the colonization of the Amazon, whose objective was to strengthen the Portuguese domain over native communities in the so-called “descimentos” and villages. Stradelli also wrote his beautiful work using his own interpretation, as well as Barbosa Rodrigues and more recently Casanovas and other modern researchers such as Professor Eduardo Navarro, in his work that gave him support for the teaching of language at the University of São Paulo - USP . However, today, the speakers themselves have sought to use their own spelling and support them through spelling conversions and agreements between different peoples, just as happened with the three variants of the Nheengatu language led by teachers and language activists. Thus, the variants yẽgatu, traditional nheengatu, and tapajoawara gained their own spellings.

Yẽgatu 
With the New Unified Orthography, teachers from the Rio Negro made their orthographic convention to standardize the language in the region, more adapted to the phonology of the language, less linked to Portuguese conventions. Since then, its faculty and students, following the convention's rules, tend to include the use of tildes over the vowels "e", "i" and "u"; the use of "k" in place of "c" and "qu"; the use of simple "s" in place of "ç", "ce", "ci" or "ss"; the use of "y" and "w" to represent semivowels; the use of "y" next to the nasal vowel instead of "nh"; the use of simple consonants next to the nasal vowel instead of consonant clusters "mb", "nd", "ng", "nt"; reduction in tonic accentuation; and extinguish the vowel ‘o’ to make room only for ‘u’. Quite different from writing practiced, in a traditional way.

Traditional Nheengatu 
The same happened with the traditional Nheengatu spoken in the Lower Amazon, where the Maraguá, Mura and part of the Sateré-Mawé people decided in a convention to formalize their own spelling linked to the traditionalism by which they were used to writing. Thus, the Dictionary and Study of the Traditional Nheengatu Language was written, which emphasizes ancient speech and writing, not so different from the works of Stradelli or Barbosa Rodrigues. Under its convention, the use of all vowels is described as a rule, including the Y and W. The recognition of twelve traditional consonants (b,ç,d,g,k,m,n,p,r,s,t,x), of three new consonants linked to foreign words converted to nheengatu (l,j,h) and seven vowels (a,e,i,o,u,w,y), in addition to keeping the 'nh ' written, and the use of 'y' Tupi (sound of u/e at the same time) which does not exist in Portuguese and which are present in a few words of this variant.

Tapajoawara Nheengatu 
The Tapajós variant, linked to the Borari, Arapium, Tapajós peoples, among others, also had its convection, where the organization of indigenous teachers (in all more than two hundred teachers) has done everything to leverage the Heengatu language in the region, including production from the book “Nheengatu tapajoawara” where they approach a specific spelling closer to that of Casanovas, but a middle ground between the Negro river nheengatu and the traditional nheengatu.

All three variants and their spelling perspectives are recognized by the Academy of Nheengatu Language (ALN).

Phonology

Consonants 

Parentheses mark marginal phonemes occurring only in few words, or with otherwise unclear status.

Vowels

Morphology 
There are eight word classes in Nheengatu: nouns, verbs, adjectives, adverbs, postpositions, pronouns, demonstratives and particles. These eight word classes are also reflected in Cruz (2011)’s Fonologia e Gramática do Nheengatú. In her books, Cruz includes 5 chapters in the Morphology section that describes lexical classes, nominal and verbal lexicogenesis, the structure of the noun phrase and grammatical structures. In the section on lexical classes, Cruz discusses personal pronominal prefixes, nouns and their subclasses (including personal, anaphoric and demonstrative pronouns as well as relative nouns), verbs and their subclasses (such as stative, transitive and intransitive verbs) and adverbial expressions. The subsequent chapter on nominal lexicogenesis discusses endocentric derivation, nominalization and nominal composition. Under verbal lexicogenesis in Chapter 7, Cruz covers valency, reduplication and the borrowing of loanwords from Portuguese. The following chapter then discusses the distinction between particles and clitics, including examples and properties of each grammatical structure.

Pronouns 
There are two types of pronouns in Nheengatu: personal or interrogative. Nheengatu follows the same pattern as Tupinambá, in that the same set of personal pronouns is adopted for the subject and object of a verb.

Examples of Personal Pronouns in use:

As observed in Table 3, in Nheengatu, personal pronouns can also take the form of prefixes. These prefixes are necessary in the usage of verbs as well as postpositions. In the latter case, free forms of the pronouns are not permitted. Moore illustrates this with the following:

The free form of the first person singular pronoun cannot be combined with the postposition word for ‘with’.

The second set of pronouns are interrogative, and are used in question words.

Verbal affixes 
According to Moore (2014), throughout the evolution of Nheengatu, processes such as compounding were greatly reduced. Moore cites a summary by Rodrigues (1986), stating that Nheegatu lost Tupinambá's system of five moods (indicative, imperative, gerund, circumstantial and subjunctive), converging into a single indicative mood. Despite such changes alongside influences from Portuguese, however, derivational and inflectional affixation was still intact from Tupinambá. A select number of modern affixes arose via grammaticization of what used to be lexical items. For example, Moore (2014) provides the example of the former lexical item ‘etá’, which means ‘many’. Over time and grammaticization, this word became to plural suffix ‘-itá’.

Apart from the pronominal prefixes shown in Table (3), there are also verbal prefixes. Verbs in Nheengatu fall into three mutually exclusive categories: intransitive, transitive and stative. By attaching verbal prefixes to these verbs, a sentence can be considered well-formed.

Examples of verbal prefixes:

In these examples from Moore (2014), the verbal first person singular prefix ‘a-’ is added to the intransitive verb for ‘work’ and transitive verb for ‘make’ respective. Only when prefixed with this verbal clitic, can they be considered well-formed sentences.

Reduplication 
Another interesting morphological feature of Nheengatu is reduplication, which Cruz (2011) explains in her grammar to employed differently based on the community of Nheengatu speakers. This is a morphological process that was originally present in Tupinambá, and it tends to be used to indicate a repeated action.

In this example, the reduplicated segment is tuka, which is the Nheengatu verb for ‘knock’. This surfaces as a fully reduplicated segment. However, partial reduplication also occurs in this language. In the following example elicited by Cruz, the speaker reduplicates the first two syllables (a CVCV sequence) of the stem word.

Another point to note from the above example is the usage of the plural word ita. Cruz (2011) highlights that there is a distinction in the usage of reduplication between communities. The speakers of Içana and the upper region of the Rio Negro use Nheengatu as their main language, and reduplication occurs in the stative verbs, expressing intensity of a property, and the plural word ita doesn't necessarily need to be used. On the other hand, in Santa Isabel do Rio Negro and the more urban area of São Gabriel da Cachoeira, speakers tend to be bilingual, with Portuguese used as the main language. In this context, these speakers also employ reduplication to indicate the intensity of a property, but the plural ita must be used if the subject is plural.

Text samples 

 Pedro Luiz Sympson, 1876
 A! xé ánga, hu emoté i Iára. / Xé abú iu hu rori ána Tupã recé xá ceiépi. / Maá recé hu senú i miaçúa suhi apipe abasáua: / ahé recé upáem miraitá hu senecáre iché aié pepasáua. / Maá recé Tupã hu munha iché áramau páem maá turuçusáua, / i r'ira puranga eté. / Y ahé icatusáua xé hu muçaim ramé, r'ira péaca upáem r'iapéaca ramé, maá haé aitá hu sequéié.

 Pe. Afonso Casanovas, 2006
 Aikwé paá yepé tetama puranga waá yepé ipawa wasú rimbiwa upé. Kwa paá, wakaraitá retama. Muíri akayú, paá, kurasí ara ramé, kwá uakaraitá aywã ta usú tawatá apekatú rupí. Muíri viaje, tausú rundé, aintá aría waimí uyupuí aitá piripiriaka suikiri waá irũ, ti arã tausaã yumasí tauwatá pukusawa.

 Eduardo de Almeida Navarro, 2011
 1910 ramé, mairamé aé uriku 23 akaiú, aé uiupiru ana uuatá-uatá Amazônia rupi, upitá mími musapíri akaiú pukusaua. Aé ukunheséri ana siía mira upurungitá uaá nheengatu, asuí aé umunhã nheengarisaua-itá marandua-itá irũmu Barbosa Rodrigues umupinima ana uaá Poranduba Amazonense resé.

 Aline da Cruz, 2011
 A partir di kui te, penhe nunka mais pesu pekuntai aitekua yane nheenga. Yande kuri, mira ita, yasu yakuntai. Ixe kuri asu akuntai perupi. Ixe kua mira. Ixe asu akuntai perupi. Penhe kuri tiã pesu pekuntai. Pepuderi kuri penheengari yalegrairã yane felisidaderã.

 Trecho do livro Yasú Yapurũgitá Yẽgatú, 2014
 Se mãya uyutima nãnã kupixawa upé. Nãnã purãga yaú arama yawẽtu asuí purãga mĩgaú arama yuiri. Aikué siya nãnã nũgaraita. Purãga usemu mamé iwí yumunaniwa praya irũmu.

 Roger Manuel López Yusuino (nheengatu venezuelano), 2013
 Tukana aé yepé virá purangava asoi orikú bando ipinima sava, ogustari oyengari kuemaite asoi osemo ara ramé osikari arama ombaó vasaí iyá. Tukana yepé virá porangava yambaó arama asoi avasemo aé kaáope asoi garapé rimbiva ropí.

See also 

Língua Geral
Region of Cabeça do Cachorro
 Instituto do Patrimônio Histórico e Artístico Nacional (IPHAN)

References

Sources 

 Instituto Socio-Ambiental
 Rohter, Larry.  "Language Born of Colonialism Thrives Again in Amazon." New York Times. August 28, 2005.

Bibliography 

 Dicionário de estudos de Nheengatu Tradicional, ISBN 9786599450402, Author's edition, 2021.
 YAMÃ, Yaguarẽ, Cartilha Gramatical do Nheengatu Tradicional, Author's edition.
 SCHWADE, Michéli Carolíni de Deus Lima (2014), Descrição Fonético-Fonológica do Nheengatu Falado no Médio Rio Amazonas, Manaus: Universidade Federal do Amazonas - UFAM [Available in: https://tede.ufam.edu.br/bitstream/tede/4610/2/Disserta%C3%A7%C3%A3o%20-%20Mich%C3%A9li%20C%20de%20D%20Schwade.pdf]
 BORARI, Kawã Wirapaye, O Nheengatu Tapajowara.
 Letra 16, Revista, Nheengatu Tapajoara.
 NAVARRO, Eduardo de Almeida (2011), Curso de língua geral (nheengatu ou tupi moderno) – A língua das origens da civilização amazônica, ISBN 978-85-912620-0-7, São Paulo: Author's edition. 112 pp.
 SYMPSON, Pedro Luís, Gramática da língua brasileira: brasílica, tupi ou nheengatu.
 CASASNOVAS, Padre A (2006), Noções de língua geral ou nheengatu 2ª ed. , Manaus: UFAM; Faculdade Salesiana Dom Bosco

External links 

.
.
.
.
 .
 .
 .
 .
 .
 .
 .
 
 .
 .
 .
 .
 .
 .
 .
 .

Group links and study tools 

English-Nheengatu online dictionary
Playlist with video classes by Prof Eduardo Navarro and support material in PDF in the description of the playlist
Website of Jehovah's Witnesses in Nheengatu, with texts, videos and audios

Languages of Venezuela
Tupi–Guarani languages
Indigenous languages of Northern Amazonia
Languages of Colombia
Endangered Tupian languages